Beddau Halt railway station was a railway station at Beddau, Rhondda Cynon Taf, Wales.

It consisted of a single platform and shelter reached by steps leading from the road over which the line crossed. Its position was quite a distance from Beddau which limited its patronage, though all trains stopped at the station as a matter of course.

Modern Day
The station site exists on the mothballed Pontyclun-Cwm Colliery line over which trains ran regularly until 1984. While some railway infrastructure still exists such as the sleepers no trace of the platform is evident.

References

External links

Disused railway stations in Rhondda Cynon Taf
Former Taff Vale Railway stations
Railway stations in Great Britain opened in 1910
Railway stations in Great Britain closed in 1952
Llantrisant